José Luís Banquart Leitão (born 6 April 1965) is a Portuguese athlete. He competed in the men's long jump and the men's triple jump at the 1988 Summer Olympics.

References

External links
 

1965 births
Living people
Athletes (track and field) at the 1988 Summer Olympics
Portuguese male long jumpers
Portuguese male triple jumpers
Olympic athletes of Portugal
Place of birth missing (living people)